Columbus is a city in Anoka County, Minnesota, United States. The population was 3,914 at the 2010 census.

History
The city was known as Columbus Township until September 21, 2006, when it was incorporated as the city of Columbus, in response to concerns that the adjacent city of Forest Lake was planning to annex portions of the township.

Mel Mettler, the first mayor of Columbus, was reelected in 2008. Jesse Preiner was elected mayor in 2019.

Running Aces Harness Park, a 5/8 mile harness horse racing track, opened in Columbus in April 2008.

Geography

Anoka County Roads 18, 19, 23, 54, and 62 are the main routes in the community. Interstate 35 splits into Interstates 35E and 35W within the southeast corner of Columbus. The junction is commonly known as the Forest Lake Split, after the city to the immediate east.

Rice Creek flows through Columbus. Carlos Avery Wildlife Area is in the north-central and west-central parts of the city.

Nearby places include Forest Lake, Lino Lakes, Ham Lake, East Bethel, and Wyoming.

Demographics

2010 census
As of the census of 2010, there were 3,914 people, 1,416 households, and 1,119 families residing in the city. The racial makeup of the city was 93.6% White, 0.7% African American, 0.6% Native American, 3.6% Asian, 0.1% Pacific Islander, 0.2% from other races, and 1.2% from two or more races. Hispanic or Latino of any race were 1.6% of the population.

There were 1,416 households, of which 31.3% had children under the age of 18 living with them, 69.1% were married couples living together, 5.2% had a female householder with no husband present, 4.8% had a male householder with no wife present, and 21.0% were non-families. 15.5% of all households were made up of individuals, and 5.9% had someone living alone who was 65 years of age or older. The average household size was 2.76 and the average family size was 3.08.

The median age in the city was 45.3 years. 22.3% of residents were under the age of 18; 7.5% were between the ages of 18 and 24; 19.5% were from 25 to 44; 39.6% were from 45 to 64; and 11.2% were 65 years of age or older. The gender makeup of the city was 51.9% male and 48.1% female.

2000 census
As of the census of 2000, there were 3,957 people, 1,328 households, and 1,120 families residing in the township. The racial makeup of the township was 97.60% White, 0.18% African American, 0.56% Native American, 0.56% Asian, 0.08% from other races, and 1.04% from two or more races. Hispanic or Latino of any race were 0.58% of the population.

There were 1,328 households, out of which 39.3% had children under the age of 18 living with them, 74.9% were married couples living together, 5.3% had a female householder with no husband present, and 15.6% were non-families. 11.1% of all households were made up of individuals, and 2.8% had someone living alone who was 65 years of age or older. The average household size was 2.97 and the average family size was 3.22.

In the township the population was spread out, with 27.8% under the age of 18, 7.5% from 18 to 24, 29.5% from 25 to 44, 28.9% from 45 to 64, and 6.2% who were 65 years of age or older. The median age 38. For every 100 females, there were 106.5 males. For every 100 females age 18 and over, there were 106.2 males.

The median income for a household in the township was $67,500, and the median income for a family was $71,809. Males had a median income of $42,948 versus $31,417 for females. The per capita income for the township was $24,479. About 2.2% of families and 3.8% of the population were below the poverty line, including 3.2% of those under age 18 and 2.8% of those age 65 or over.

References

External links
 
City website
ePodunk: Profile for Columbus, Minnesota
Minnesota Demographics

Cities in Anoka County, Minnesota
Cities in Minnesota
Populated places established in 2006
Defunct townships in Minnesota